Swan Lake Park is located on East Main Street, East Patchogue, in the township of Brookhaven, Suffolk County, New York. Swan Lake is nestled between Swan Lake drive on the west side of the lake and Lake drive to the east of the lake.

The park has a variety of Long Island ducks, swans, birds, fish, etc., and a natural flowing lake that empties into the Swan River. The park has a small community civic house on the lake which is overseen by the Swan Lake Park Civic Association. Local resident feed the many species of ducks that make this lake their home.

See also
East Patchogue
Pine Neck

External links 
 http://www.merchantcircle.com/business/Swan.Lake.Park.Civic.Association.Incorporated.631-654-3031
 http://web2.userinstinct.com/29646129-swan-lake-park-civic-association-inc.htm
 http://www.patchoguechamber.com/

Parks in Suffolk County, New York
Brookhaven, New York